Growing pains are recurring pain symptoms that are relatively common in children ages 3 to 12.  The pains normally appear at night and affect the calf or thigh muscles of both legs.  The pain stops on its own before morning.

Growing pains are one of the most common causes of recurring pain in children.  Although these pains reliably stop when the child has completely finished growing, it likely has nothing to do with growth.

Signs and symptoms 
Growing pains usually affect both legs, especially the calf muscle in the lower leg or the muscles in the front of the thighs.  Less commonly, the arms are affected.  They are normally felt on both sides.  Typically, the pains are felt in the muscles, rather than in the joints.  The amount of pain varies from mild to very severe.

The pains may start in the evening or at night.  Because the pains normally appear while the child is sleeping, they often wake the child up at night.  The pains often last for 30 minutes to two hours, and are often but not always gone by the morning.  Typically, the pains appear once or twice each week, but it can be more frequent or less frequent.

The pains are not in the same place as an injury, including overuse injuries such as shin splints, and the child does not limp while walking.

Cause
The causes of growing pains are unknown. They are not associated with growth spurts, and some authors suggest alternative terms as providing a more accurate description, such as recurrent limb pain in childhood, paroxysmal nocturnal pains, or benign idiopathic paroxysmal nocturnal limb pains of childhood.

Theories of causation include:
 poor posture or other mechanical or anatomical defects, such as joint hypermobility;
 vascular perfusion disorder, 
 lower pain threshold or a pain amplification syndrome,
 tiredness, perhaps especially among children with weaker bones than average who have overexerted themselves; and 
 psychological factors, such as stress within the family. 
Some parents are able to associate episodes of pain with physical exercise or mood changes in the child.

Diagnosis 
This diagnosis is normally made by considering the information presented by the child and family members, and by doing a physical exam to make sure that the child seems to be otherwise healthy.  When the child has the typical symptoms and appears to be healthy, then laboratory investigations to exclude other diagnoses is not warranted.

When a child has growing pains, there are no objective clinical signs of inflammation, such as swollen joints.  Children with growing pains do not have signs of any systemic diseases (such as fever or skin rashes), any abnormal pain sensations, tender spots, or joint disorders.  Children do not have growing pains if the pain worsens over time, persists during the daytime, only involves one limb, or is located in a joint.  It should be excluded if the child is limping, loses the ability to walk, or has physical signs that suggest other medical conditions.

Childhood-onset restless legs syndrome is sometimes misdiagnosed as growing pains. Other possible causes of pain in the limbs include injuries, infections, benign tumors such as osteoid osteoma, malignant tumors such as osteosarcoma, and problems that affect the shape and function of the legs, such as genu valgum (knock-knees).

Treatment
Parents and children can be substantially reassured by explaining the benign and self-limiting nature of the pains. Local massage, hot baths, hot water bottles or heating pads, and analgesic drugs such as paracetamol (acetaminophen) are often used during pain episodes.  Twice-daily stretching of the quadriceps, hamstrings, and gastrosoleus muscles can make the leg pains resolve more quickly when it appears.

Prognosis
Growing pains are not associated with other serious disease and usually resolves by late childhood.  Commonly, episodes of growing pains become less severe and less frequent over time, and many children outgrow them after one or two years.

Frequent episodes are capable of having a substantial effect on the life of the child.

Epidemiology
Growing pains likely affect about 10 to 20% of children, and the rate may be as high as about 40% among children aged four to six.  Individuals can vary markedly in when they experience growing pains.

History
Growing pains were first described as such in 1823 by a French doctor, Marcel Duchamp, and the cause was attributed to the growth process.  A century later, mainstream medicine thought that the pains were caused by a mild case of rheumatic fever.

See also
Cramp
Weather pains

References

External links 

Pain
Childhood